The Family is an American documentary streaming television miniseries that premiered on Netflix on August 9, 2019. The series examines a conservative Christian group—known as the Family or the Fellowship—its history, and investigates its influence on American politics.

The series was executive produced by Jeff Sharlet, who previously wrote books about the same organization, including C Street: The Fundamentalist Threat to American Democracy and The Family: The Secret Fundamentalism at the Heart of American Power.

Cast
 David Rysdahl as Jeff Sharlet.
 Sharlet appears as himself in the documentary interview portions of the series.
 Ben Rosenfield.
 Zachary Booth 
 Michael Park 
 Nate Klingenberg
 Tessa Albertson

 James Cromwell as Douglas Coe

Episodes

Reception
Critics have generally praised the series. For Decider, Joel Keller described it as having "a lot of potential to fascinate". Joel Mayward of Cinemayard described the series as "chilling" but also wrote that it felt "muddled and redundant". Vultures Jen Chaney noted that the series focused predominantly on the Fellowship's influence on conservatives, and excluded Democratic involvement.

Release
The Family was released on August 9, 2019 on Netflix.

See also
Douglas Coe

References

External links
 
 

2010s American documentary television series
2019 American television series debuts
2019 American television series endings
English-language Netflix original programming
Netflix original documentary television series
Television series about families